Disney's Party is a party video game, developed by Hudson Soft for the GameCube and by Jupiter Corporation for the Game Boy Advance. The games are much like the games of the Hudson Soft-produced Mario Party series, in which the player competes in mini-games to win the game.

Gameplay
The gameplay in this game is different from other games of its kind. In starting the game, there are only up to 4 different choices. The player then votes on these choices, the more votes a game receives the more it increases the chance of the spinner landing on it. Whatever game the spinner lands on is then played. Similar to the popular Mario Party series, the players play on a game board, which features an item shop stocked with items for use on the board's spaces. In order to win the game, they must advance and land on the flag where it says destination. They have to play another minigame to win the park. When winning the most parks they advance to a boss stage. Upon the boss' defeat, the game is over and the credits appear.

Reception

The game received "mixed to negative" reviews from critics, Metacritic gave the GameCube version a score of 39%, based on three reviews. Game Rankings gave the Game Boy Advance version a 40.3% while the GameCube version was given a 37.4%. IGN gave the GameCube version a 5.2 out of 10, saying, "Is the kingdom able to retain its magic?". While they gave the Game Boy Advance version a 4 out of 10, writing: "If this is a party, someone forgot to bring the chips and beer".

Notes

References

External links

2002 video games
Mickey Mouse video games
Electronic Arts games
Game Boy Advance games
GameCube games
Hudson Soft games
Jupiter (company) games
Tomy games
Party video games
Donald Duck video games
Goofy (Disney) video games
Neverland (company) games
Multiplayer and single-player video games
Video games developed in Japan